Lea Stöckel (born 23 April 1994) is a former field hockey player from Germany, who played as a midfielder.

Career

Club hockey
In the German Bundesliga, Stöckel plays hockey for Rot-Weiss Köln.

National teams

Under–21
Lea Stöckel made her debut for the Germany U–21 in 2012 at the EuroHockey Junior Championship in 's-Hertogenbosch. She followed this with an appearance at the 2013 Junior World Cup in Mönchengladbach and at the 2014 EuroHockey Junior Championship in Waterloo.

Die Danas
Stöckel made her debut for the Die Danas in 2013.

Throughout her career, Stöckel won two medals with the national team. She won gold at the 2013 EuroHockey Championships in Boom, as well as bronze at the 2015 EuroHockey Championships in London.

International goals

References

External links
 
 

1994 births
Living people
German female field hockey players
Female field hockey midfielders
Rot-Weiss Köln players
Feldhockey Bundesliga (Women's field hockey) players